The Großer Zechliner See is a lake in the Rheinsberg Lake Region of Brandenburg, Germany.

See also
Großer Prebelowsee
Schwarzer See
Tietzowsee
Zootzensee

Lakes of Brandenburg
Ostprignitz-Ruppin
Federal waterways in Germany
LGrosserZechlinerSee